Virginia Ruano Pascual (born 21 September 1973) is a Spanish former professional tennis player. She had moderate success in singles, winning three career Women's Tennis Association (WTA) titles as well as reaching two Grand Slam quarterfinals and a top-30 ranking, but she had been far more successful in doubles. 

She won 43 career WTA doubles titles, including eleven at Grand Slam tournaments: ten in women's doubles (eight partnering Paola Suárez, and two partnering Anabel Medina Garrigues) and one in mixed doubles (partnering Tomás Carbonell). Between 2002 and 2004, along with Suárez, she reached nine consecutive Grand Slam tournament finals (won five) and they reached at least the semifinals of the last twelve Grand Slam tournaments they played. Their winning run came to an end when they lost in the 2009 Wimbledon semifinals. Alongside Suarez, the pair was names as a ITF World Champions for the three consecutive years in-a-row (2002-2004).

Personal life
Her father, Juan Manuel, works for Iberia Airlines; her mother, Virginia, is a housewife. Her brother, Juan Ramon, is a tennis pro at a club and also serves as her coach and her sister, Marbella, works in administration. Initially, she hyphenated her family names, but she has omitted the hyphen since 1998.

Career

Women's doubles

Grand Slams 
Ruano Pascual was very successful at the Grand Slams. In total, she won 10 titles in doubles events. She lifted the French Open trophy six times. The first one she won in 2001 along with Paola Suárez, with whom she one year ago played final but they lost. In 2002, she defended her title again with Suárez. The following year, she also reached final but finished as a runner-up, again with Suárez. The pair then triumphed again in 2004 and 2005. After three years without reaching final at the French Open, in 2008 she won another title but this time with Anabel Medina Garrigues. They successfully defended their title in 2009. 

French Open is not the only Grand Slam she has won. In 2004, with Suarez, she won her first and only Australian Open title. At the US Open, she collected three titles. Her first final and also title was in 2002 with Suarez. After that, the pair defended their title in the following two years (2003 and 2004). Despite not winning any title at the Wimbledon Championships, she finished as a runner-up three times (2002, 2003 and 2006). Along with her success in women's doubles, she also won one mixed doubles title at the 2001 French Open. Alongside Suárez, the pair was names as a ITF World Champions for the three consecutive years in-a-row (2002-2004).

Other significant results 
Along with great performances at the highest-level tournaments (Grand Slams), she had success on the WTA Premier Mandatory&5 tournaments as well. It all started with the title at the Italian Open in 1998, that also was her first either quarterfinal, semifinal or final on this level. In 2000, she done well at the Charleston Open, winning her second level title. Two years later, she went step further, winning two titles (Italian Open & Canadian Open). After winning per two titles in 2003 and 2004, in 2005 she won three titles to get to the total number of 11 titles from this level. Her last title was the 2005 San Diego Open. At most of the level tournaments, she had at least quarterfinal with one exception, the China Open that was reclassifed as WTA Premier Mandatory tournament just two years before Ruano Pascual retirement. She also has one year-end championships title at the 2003 WTA Tour Championships.

Ranking and national contribution 
Being one of the most successful doubles players, she did not leave her mark only on the Grand Slams & WTA Premier Mandatory/5 tournaments. She also is former world No. 1 that she achieved in September 2003. In the end of 2004, she finished year as top ranked player. In 2005, she also spend some weeks at the highest position, but finished year as world No. 4. Until her retirement in 2010, she spend at least one week inside top 10 in each season. She also left her mark playing for Spain at the national competitions. At the Summer Olympics, she won two silver medals, in 2004 with Conchita Martínez and in 2008 with Medina Garrigues.

Singles 
Along with her doubles success, she had solid singles career as well. In April 1999, she get to the place of 28. She has won three WTA titles. At the Grand Slams, she reached two quarterfinals; at the French Open in 1995 and Australian Open in 2003.

Performance timelines

Only main-draw results in WTA Tour, Grand Slam tournaments, Fed Cup and Olympic Games are included in win–loss records.

Singles

Doubles

Grand Slam finals

Doubles: 10 titles, 6 runner-ups

Mixed doubles: 1 title

Other significant finals

WTA Tour Championships finals

Doubles: 1 title

Summer Olympics finals

Doubles: 2 silver medals

WTA Premier Mandatory & 5 finals

Doubles: 22 (11 titles, 11 runner-ups)

WTA career finals

Singles: 3 titles

Doubles: 78 (43 titles, 35 runner-ups)

ITF finals

Singles: 7 (4 titles, 3 runner-ups)

Doubles: 18 (10 titles, 8 runner-ups)

Top 10 wins

Awards
 Named WTA Tour Doubles Team of the Year for third straight year for 2004 with partner Paola Suárez.
 With partner Paola Suárez, received Premio Consagración Clarín al Mérito Deportivo 2003, an award presented to Argentine athletes for their achievements
 With partner Paola Suárez, named 2002 WTA Tour Doubles Team of the Year and 2002 ITF Women's Doubles World Champions
 In 1993 helped Spain recapture the Fed Cup title and defended it in 1994

Notes

References

External links

 
 
 

1973 births
Living people
Tennis players from Madrid
Spanish female tennis players
Olympic tennis players of Spain
Tennis players at the 1996 Summer Olympics
Tennis players at the 2004 Summer Olympics
Tennis players at the 2008 Summer Olympics
Australian Open (tennis) champions
French Open champions
US Open (tennis) champions
Olympic silver medalists for Spain
Olympic medalists in tennis
Hopman Cup competitors
Grand Slam (tennis) champions in women's doubles
Grand Slam (tennis) champions in mixed doubles
Medalists at the 2008 Summer Olympics
Medalists at the 2004 Summer Olympics
Mediterranean Games silver medalists for Spain
Mediterranean Games bronze medalists for Spain
Competitors at the 1993 Mediterranean Games
Mediterranean Games medalists in tennis
WTA number 1 ranked doubles tennis players
ITF World Champions